Marcelino Bilbao Bilbao (16 January 1920 in Alonsotegi–25 January 2014) was a lieutenant in the Isaac Puente battalion of the Confederación Nacional del Trabajo (CNT)  of the Basque Country and survivor of Mauthausen concentration camp and the Ebensee concentration camp.

Biography
Orphan by birth, he left school at the age of twelve. He temporarily worked at the “La Primitiva” mine in Castrejana (Baracaldo). Shortly after, he started working at the “Rica” jute spinning factory.

Spanish Civil War 
During the Second Spanish Republic he was a member of the Unified Socialist Youth (JSU), but at the outbreak of the Spanish Civil War he joined the Isaac Puente No. 11 battalion of the Euzko Gudarostea, the No. 3 of the Euzkadi Confederación Nacional del Trabajo (CNT).

In November 1936 he participated in the Villarreal offensive. In February and March 1937 Marcelino Bilbao fought with the Isaac Puente battalion in the siege of Oviedo, integrated into the 1st Brigade of the Basque Expeditionary Brigades. Faced with General Mola's offensive, he participated in the withdrawal of the Guipuzcoan fronts, was a direct witness to the bombardment of Guernica and fought in the battle of Sollube. After the fall of the Bilbao's Iron Ring, it went to Santander and from there to Asturias, participating in the Battle of Mazuco. In this battle, the entire battalion was decorated with the Medal of Freedom (highest distinction of the Second Spanish Republic) awarded by Belarmino Tomás, president of the Sovereign Council of Asturias and León, to the commander of the battalion, Antonio Teresa de Miguel.

When the northern front fell, he managed to embark in Avilés for Bordeaux. From there he was transferred by train to Catalonia. In December 1937, Marcelino Bilbao joined and commanded the “63. Maxim ”Machine Gun Company of the Special Defense Against Aircraft (DECA) of the People's Army of the Republic (EPR).

Under his leadership the unit fought in the Battle of Teruel (February 1938), where he met Valentín González, “El Campesino”. After the unsuccessful offensive on Teruel, the company fell back until it reached Lleida, where it coincided with Valentín González (“El Campesino”) and Enrique Lister. During the summer of 1938 he participated in the Battle of the Ebro and was awarded the Medal of Valor. At the end of 1938 Marcelino Bilbao was transferred to Battery No. 528 Oerlikon of the Defensa Especial Contra Aeronaves (DECA) (Special Defense Against Aircraft) and on February 9 he crossed the French border through La Junquera.

France 
Once in France he was in the concentration camps of Saint-Cyprien, Argelès-sur-Mer, and Gurs. In this last field he met José María Aguirre Salaberría, his future brother-in-law and companion in captivity in Mauthausen.

In Gurs Marcelino joined the Foreign Workers Company and was assigned to the "26 work company". After a short stay in the Septfonds concentration camp he was transferred to the Maginot Line. Captured by the Nazis in Epinal in June 1940, he was transferred to the Stalag V D in Strasbourg (identification number 3293).

Mauthausen 
On December 13, 1940 he was deported to the Mauthausen concentration camp (Austria) with identification number 4628. There he worked for two years in the well-known quarry of Mauthausen, and managed to survive thanks to his picaresque and his youth. During his stay in Mauthausen he was the victim of an experiment that the Nazi doctor Aribert Heim carried out with 30 prisoners using toxic elements and of whom only 7 survived. Finally, on April 10, 1943, he left Mauthausen permanently to move to the concentration camp by Ebensee. There, thanks to the experience gained and the group of Spanish Republicans, he managed to get a job in the country kitchen.

Faced with the withdrawal of the Nazis from all fronts, he participated in the resistance apparatus of the camp created in order to prevent the slaughter of the prisoners. On May 5, 1945, the Ebensee concentration camp was liberated. After a last odyssey through Austria together with other colleagues he managed to reach Paris on foot, where he was treated by the French Government.

Bibliography

References

20th-century Spanish military personnel
1920 births
2014 deaths
Mauthausen concentration camp survivors
People from Alonsotegi